Early decision  is a college admission plan in which students apply earlier in the year than usual and receive their results early as well.  (It is completely different from “early admission,” which is when a high school student applies to college in 11th grade and starts college without graduating from high school.) This benefits students by reducing the number of applications to be completed at one time, and by providing results early.  It benefits colleges as they generally know what their accepted student pool will look like before the regular admission process begins.  Most colleges that participate in early admission request applications by October 15 or November 1 and return results by December 15.

On September 12, 2006, Harvard University ended its early decision program, a move that had profound effects on college admissions nationwide. Harvard Dean of Admissions William R. Fitzsimmons explained the move was intended to decrease the privileging of wealthy applicants by the early decision process. In 2007, the University of Florida, the University of Virginia, the University of North Carolina at Chapel Hill, and Princeton University joined Harvard when they announced that they were discontinuing their early decision programtin an effort to help foster economic diversity in their student bodies. In 2011, Harvard University, Princeton University and several others reinstated their early decision programs.

Common early decision plans include:
Early action — a program that is not binding
Early decision — a program that is binding

All colleges define “early admission” programs differently, which is considering applications from exceptionally qualified high school students who wish to enter college after the junior year. Students interested in early admission typically have outstanding high school records and have exhausted the educational opportunities available to them at their high schools.

See also
College admissions
Rolling admission

References

University and college admissions